9 Vulpeculae is a star in the northern constellation of Vulpecula, located about 560 light years away based on parallax. It is visible to the naked eye as a faint, blue-white hued star with a baseline apparent visual magnitude of 5.01. The star is moving further from the Earth with a heliocentric radial velocity of +5 km/s.

This a B-type star with a stellar classification of B8 IIIn, where the 'n' notation indicates "nebulous" lines due to rapid rotation. It has a high rate of spin with a projected rotational velocity of 185 km/s. This is a suspected variable star of unknown type, ranging in magnitude from 4.99 down to 5.08.

9 Vulpeculae has two reported companions: component B, with a separation of 9.3" and magnitude 13.4, and C, with a separation of 108" and a magnitude of 12.5".  Both are unrelated background objects.

References

B-type giants
Suspected variables
Vulpecula
Durchmusterung objects
Vulpeculae, 9
184606
096275
7437